LaCroix or La Croix is an American brand of sparkling water that originated in La Crosse, Wisconsin, by G. Heileman Brewing Company and is now distributed by National Beverage Corporation. Their flavors include various fruits and fruit blends.

History 
In February 1980, the G. Heileman Brewing Company, of La Crosse, Wisconsin, introduced LaCroix as one of the first "Anti-Perrier" brands. Meant to appeal to sparkling water consumers who were put off by Perrier's "snobbish positioning", LaCroix marketed to its niche by imaging itself as an "all occasion" beverage.

The beverage fared well in popularity and sales in the surrounding Midwest region for the following decade. By 1992, the brand was estimated to be worth US$25 million. However, in the same year, due to Heileman's admitted lack of experience outside the beer market, it sold the brand to National Beverage (then Winterbrook).

In 2002, National Beverage sought to rebrand LaCroix and ended up settling on the design that was "least favored by management" but won over target consumers in a "landslide". Instead of staying with a clean and simple designs like other water brands, they found that a more bold and colorful approach was more appealing to their audience. The successful execution of the “anti-Perrier” strategy, in all its forms, has been a key factor enabling LaCroix to become one of the top sparkling water brands.

Since the early 1990s, LaCroix had been a fairly well-known product in the Midwest United States. Then, in the spring of 2015, with sugary-soda sales plummeting to a 30-year low in the U.S., National Beverage saw an opportunity to expand their consumer base, subsequently launching a marketing campaign for the beverage on social media, specifically targeting millennials. Sales “exploded” as the brand developed a national “cult following.”  Their marketing efforts have since helped position LaCroix with mainstream news outlets as a healthier alternative to sugary soda, as well as a mixer for popular cocktails.

Flavors

Sales
Sales records have never been publicly released, but market research suggests LaCroix holds a 30 percent market share in sparkling water sales in the United States, double that of its main competitor, Perrier.

Controversies

Sexual harassment allegations
Nick Caporella, the company's CEO, was accused of sexual harassment by two former employee pilots who alleged inappropriate touching on more than 30 trips between 2014 and 2016. One lawsuit was settled out of court in January 2018, and one was still pending as of July 2018.
Caporella has denied the claims and as of 2023 there has been no turnover.

"All-natural" advertising
In October 2018 a class action lawsuit was filed by Chicago law firm Beaumont Costales regarding the "all natural" branding, claiming that LaCroix uses synthetic ingredients including ethyl butanoate, limonene and linalool propionate. The company responded that "all the flavor essences in LaCroix are natural." The plaintiff has since withdrawn the lawsuit and retracted its claims.

Another lawsuit was filed in the Southern District of New York on January 29, 2019, alleging violations of New York’s Unfair and Deceptive Trade Practices Act. The lawsuit's claims are based on isotope analysis and gas chromatography mass spectrometry tests conducted by The Center for Applied Isotope Studies at the University of Georgia. This claim was also voluntarily dropped in September 2020. A similar lawsuit was filed against Polar Beverages in September 2019 regarding its "100% natural" marketing.

See also
Apollinaris
Farris
Gerolsteiner
Panna
Perrier
Polar Beverages
Ramlösa
S.Pellegrino

References

External links
 

American soft drinks
Carbonated water
1981 establishments in Wisconsin
La Crosse, Wisconsin